Harden is a civil parish in the metropolitan borough of the City of Bradford, West Yorkshire, England.  It contains 36 listed buildings that are recorded in the National Heritage List for England.  Of these, one is listed at Grade II*, the middle of the three grades, and the others are at Grade II, the lowest grade.    The parish contains the village of Harden, the smaller settlement of Ryecroft, and the surrounding area.  In the area is the St Ives Estate, which contains a number of listed buildings.  The other listed buildings include houses and associated structures, cottages, farmhouses and farm buildings, a boundary stone or guide post, a road bridge and a footbridge, two churches, and a war memorial.


Key

Buildings

References

Citations

Sources

 

Lists of listed buildings in West Yorkshire